O Gosto da Criação is the seventeenth album by Brazilian solo artist Zé Ramalho. It was released in 2002.

Track listing 
 O gosto da criação (The Taste of the Creation) – 3:48
 A única coisa que eu quero (The Only Thing That I Want) – 4:16
 Aprendendo a vencer (Learning to Win) – 4:40
 Tudo que fiz foi viver (Everything I Did Was to Live) – 4:15
 O silêncio dos inocentes (The Silence of the Innocent) – 4:44
 O que vale para sempre (What Worth Forever) – 3:33  
 Coisas boas e mais (Good Things and More) – 4:08
 Fissura (Fissure) – 5:33
 Luz da excelência (Excellence's Light) – 3:53
 Modificando o olhar (Modifying the Look) – 4:22
 É praticando na vida que muito vai aprender (One Will Learn a Lot if he Practises a Lot in the Life) – 4:05
 O apocalipse de Zé Limeira (Zé Limeira's Apocalypse) – 4:49

All music and lyrics by Zé Ramalho.

Personnel 
 Zé Ramalho – Arrangement on tracks 1, 3, 6, 7, 11, 12 acoustic guitar on all tracks, lead vocals on all tracks, twelve-string violas on tracks 5, 8, electric guitar on track 12
 Roberta de Recife – Lead vocals on tracks 5, 8, 10
 Yamandu Costa – Acoustic guitar on track 1
 Jamil Joanes – Bass on tracks 1, 2, 3, 4, 6, 7, 10, 11, 12
 Chico Guedes – Bass on tracks 5, 8
 Eduardo Krieger – Bass on track 9
 Rick Ferreira – Steel guitar on track 3
 Luiz Antônio – Keyboard on tracks 1, 2, 4, 6, 7, 9, 10, 12
 Dodô de Moraes – Arrangement on tracks 5, 8, keyboard on tracks 5, 8
 Dênis Ferreira – Drums on track 2, percussion on track 12
 Sandro Moreno – Drums on track 5, 8
 Renato Massa – Drums on track 9
 João Firmino – Percussion on tracks 1, 3, 4, 6, 7, 10
 Dênis Ferreira – Percussion on track 11
 Dominguinhos – Accordion on tracks 4, 11
 Aldrin de Caruaru – Accordion on track 10
 Waldonys – Accordion on track 12
 Toti Cavalcanti – Saxophone on tracks 5, 8
 Naílson Simões – Trumpet on track 7
 Glauco Cruz – Violin on track 10, Rebec on track 11
 Robertinho de Recife – Arrangement on all tracks except for 6, 11, Electric guitar on tracks 2, 5, 6, 11, 12, twelve-string viola on track 7, sitar on track 10

2002 albums
Zé Ramalho albums